Gernert is a surname of German origin. Notable people with the surname include:

Dick Gernert (1928–2017), American baseball player

References

German-language surnames